Juan Valdez is an advertising character, portrayed as a Colombian coffee farmer. 

Juan Valdez also may refer to:
 Juan Valdez Cafe, coffeehouse chain elaborating on the coffee promotion
 Real human individuals:
 Juan Valdez (governor) (fl. 1710), governor of Spanish colonial Texas
 Juan Valdez (activist) (1938–2012), American land grant advocate
 Juan Valdez (U.S. Marine) (fl. 1970s), noted as last American evacuee from roof of Saigon embassy
 Juan Valdez (footballer) (born 1983), Aruban athlete

See also
Juan
Valdez (disambiguation)